Endoclita makundae is a species of ghost moth (Hepialidae) described from Assam, India.

Description
Wingspan ~75mm

Range
So far only known from type locality.

Habitat
The habitat consists of evergreen and semi-evergreen forest on low relief topography.

Etymology
Named for the Makunda Christian Leprosy and General Hospital. A noun in the genitive singular meaning “of Makunda”.

References

Hepialidae